Faridabad Combined Cycle Gas Power Plant or NTPC Faridabad is located at Faridabad, in Faridabad district in the Indian state of Haryana. The power plant is one of the gas-based power plants owned by NTPC. The gas for the power plant is sourced from GAIL HBJ Pipeline. Source of water for the power plant is Rampur distributories of Gurgaon canal.

Capacity

References

 NTPC Faridabad

Natural gas-fired power stations in Haryana
Faridabad
1999 establishments in Haryana
Energy infrastructure completed in 1999